Naan is a leavened, oven-baked flatbread.

Naan may also refer to:

 Naan (1967 film), Indian Tamil language drama film
 Naan (2012 film), Indian Tamil-language thriller film
 Gustav Naan (1919–1994), Estonian physicist and philosopher
 Na'an, kibbutz near the city of Rehovot in Israel

See also
 Nan (disambiguation)